Fite may refer to:

People 
Bobby Fite (born 1968), American film and television actor
Charlene Fite (born 1950), American politician
Gilbert Fite (1918–2010), American historian
Harvey Fite (1903–1976), American sculptor and painter
Lanny Fite (born c. 1949), American politician
Lea Fite (1955–2009), American state legislator from Alabama
Linda Fite, American comics writer and editor 
Mark Fite, American actor and comedian
Nina Maria Fite, American diplomat
Rankin Fite (1916–1980), American state legislator and attorney
Samuel McClary Fite (1816–1875), American politician
Tim Fite, American musician
Warner Fite (1867–1955), American philosopher
Wendell Fite (born 1965), American DJ, producer and rapper known as DJ Hurricane

Other uses 
 Anita Fite, a fictional character in DC Comics
 Fite, Republic of Dagestan, Russia
 FITE TV, a video streaming service for ring sports live programming
 Henry Fite House, in Baltimore, Maryland, the meeting site of the Second Continental Congress
 Future Immersive Training Environment of the United States Department of Defense

See also 
 Fight (disambiguation)